The Administrative Staff College of Nigeria is a degree awarding institution located at Topo, a town in Badagry, Lagos State, southwestern Nigeria.
The college was founded in 1973 by the Federal Government of Nigeria in the Military era as a management development institution for training staff of the civil service.

Notable alumni
Martin Luther Agwai
Folashade Sherifat Jaji
Oladapo Afolabi

References

Educational institutions established in 1973
Education in Lagos State
1973 establishments in Nigeria